In mathematics, topological recursion is a recursive definition of invariants of spectral curves.
It has applications in enumerative geometry, random matrix theory, mathematical physics, string theory, knot theory.

Introduction 
The topological recursion is a construction in algebraic geometry.

The definition is a recursion on the integer 2g-2+n.

In many applications, the n-form  is interpreted as a generating function that measures a set of surfaces of genus g and with n boundaries. The recursion is on 2-2g+n the Euler characteristics, whence the name "topological recursion".

Origin 
The topological recursion was first discovered in random matrices. One main goal of random matrix theory, is to find the large size asymptotic expansion of n-point correlation functions, and in some suitable cases, the asymptotic expansion takes the form of a power series. The n-form   is then the gth coefficient in the asymptotic expansion of the n-point correlation function. It was found that the coefficients  always obey a same recursion on 2g-2+n. The idea to consider this universal recursion relation beyond random matrix theory, and to promote it as a definition of algebraic curves invariants, occurred in Eynard-Orantin 2007 who studied the main properties of those invariants.

An important application of topological recursion was to Gromov–Witten invariants.

Since then, topological recursion has generated a lot of activity in particular in enumerative geometry.
The link to Givental formalism and Frobenius manifolds has been established.

Definition 

(Case of simple branch points. For higher order branchpoints, see the section Higher order ramifications below)

  For  and :

where  is called the recursion kernel:

 For  and :

Main properties 

 poles: each  is meromorphic, it has poles only at branchpoints, with vanishing residues.
 Homogeneity:  is homogeneous of degree . Under the change , we have  .
 Dilaton equation:
 where .

 Loop equations: The following forms have no poles at branchpoints

where the sum has no prime, i.e. no term excluded.

 Deformations: The  satisfy deformation equations
The invariants  satisfy BCOV equations.

Generalizations

Higher order ramifications 

In case the  branchpoints are not simple, the definition is amended as follows (simple branchpoints correspond to k=2):

 is called the recursion kernel:

The base point * of the integral in the numerator can be chosen arbitrarily in a vicinity of the branchpoint, the invariants  will not depend on it.

Topological recursion invariants and intersection numbers 

The invariants  can be written in terms of intersection numbers of tautological classes

(*) 
where the sum is over dual graphs of stable nodal Riemann surfaces of total arithmetic genus , and  smooth labeled marked points , and equipped with a map .
 is the th Mumford's kappa class.
The Taylor expansion of  near branchpoints ,  defines the coefficients 
.

whose Taylor expansion near a branchpoint  is 
.

Write also the Taylor expansion of 
.
Equivalently, the coefficients  can be found from expansion coefficients of the Laplace transform, and the coefficients  are the expansion coefficients of the log of the Laplace transform
 .

For example, we have

The formula (*) generalizes ELSV formula as well as Mumford's formula and Mariño-Vafa formula.

Some applications in enumerative geometry

Mirzakhani's recursion 
M. Mirzakhani's recursion for hyperbolic volumes of moduli spaces is an instance of topological recursion.
For the choice of spectral curve 

the n-form  is the Laplace transform of the Weil-Petersson volume

The topological recursion for the n-forms , is then equivalent to Mirzakhani's recursion.

Witten–Kontsevich intersection numbers 
For the choice of spectral curve 

the n-form  is

where  is the Witten-Kontsevich intersection number of Chern classes of cotangent line bundles in the compactified moduli space of Riemann surfaces of genus g with n smooth marked points.

Hurwitz numbers 
For the choice of spectral curve 

the n-form  is

where  is the connected simple Hurwitz number of genus g with ramification : the number of branch covers of the Riemann sphere by a genus g connected surface, with 2g-2+n simple ramification points, and one point with ramification profile given by the partition .

Gromov–Witten numbers and the BKMP conjecture 

Let  a toric Calabi–Yau 3-fold, with Kähler moduli .
Its mirror manifold is singular over a complex plane curve  given by a polynomial equation , whose coefficients are functions of the Kähler moduli.
For the choice of spectral curve 

According to the BKMP conjecture, the n-form  is

where 

The BKMP conjecture has since then been proven.

Notes

References 

Topology
Algebraic geometry
Mathematical physics
String theory